Manel Terraza Farré (born 11 May 1990) is a Spanish field hockey player. At the 2012 Summer Olympics, he competed for the national team in the men's tournament.

References

External links
 

Living people
Spanish male field hockey players
Field hockey players at the 2012 Summer Olympics
Field hockey players at the 2016 Summer Olympics
Olympic field hockey players of Spain
1990 births
2014 Men's Hockey World Cup players